Intermezzo is a 1936 Swedish drama film directed by Gustaf Molander about a concert violinist falling in love with his daughter's piano teacher. The cast includes Gösta Ekman and Ingrid Bergman in the leads. This film led to Bergman gaining her contract with David O. Selznick and acting in a 1939 American remake opposite Leslie Howard. It was later remade again as the 1980 film Honeysuckle Rose.

Main cast
 Gösta Ekman as Professor Holger Brandt
 Inga Tidblad as Margit Brandt
 Ingrid Bergman as Anita Hoffman
 Erik Berglund as Impresario Charles Möller (credited as Bullen Berglund)
 Hugo Björne as Thomas Stenborg
 Anders Henrikson as Swedish sailor
 Hasse Ekman as Åke Brandt (credited as Hans Ekman)
 Britt Hagman as Ann-Marie Brandt

External links
 

1936 films
1936 romantic drama films
1930s Swedish-language films
Swedish black-and-white films
Romantic period films
Films about classical music and musicians
Films about violins and violinists
Films directed by Gustaf Molander
Swedish romantic drama films
1930s Swedish films